Félix de Berroeta was appointed as interim Royal Governor of Chile between September 1761 and October 1762 during the reign of Charles III of Spain.

References

Royal Governors of Chile
Year of death unknown
Year of birth unknown